Kiira Hydroelectric Power Station, is a hydroelectric power station in Uganda, with an installed capacity of .

Location

Kiira Power Station operates next to the Nalubaale Power Station at the point where the River Nile pours out of Lake Victoria starting its  journey to the Mediterranean Sea. The coordinates of Kiira Hydroelectric Power Station are: 0°27'01.0"N, 33°11'08.0"E (Latitude:0.450272; Longitude:33.185558).

History
In 1993, work started on the Nalubaale Power Station extension project. A new canal was cut to bring water from Lake Victoria to the new powerhouse. Major construction was completed in 1999. The first power from two units out of the installed five units, came online in 2000.

As of 2003, three of the five hydro power generators had been installed. Installation of the fifth and final turbine was completed in January 2007. Each unit at the extension has a capacity of 40 megawatts. During official opening ceremonies in 2003, the extension was named the "Kiira Power Station". Design and project management of the extension project was by Acres International (now part of Hatch Ltd), Canada.

Operations
In 2002, the government of Uganda, through the Uganda Electricity Generation Company, a 100 percent parastatal, awarded a 20-year operational, management, and maintenance concession to Eskom Uganda Limited, a subsidiary of Eskom, the South African energy company, to cover both Kiira Power Station and nearby Nalubaale Power Station. Eskom sells the electricity it generates to the Uganda Electricity Transmission Company Limited (UETCL), the authorized single buyer. UETCL resells the power to Umeme, the energy distributor.

Recent developments
In April 2021, the Daily Monitor newspaper reported that Eskom Uganda, the concessionaire for this dam had replaced the "electronic governor", which "controls the flow of water through the turbines". The system controls the rate of water flow and thus the amount of power output by the dam. This equipment was last replaced in 2007 and "had reached the end of its operational life".

The new equipment was manufactured and installed by  Andrtiz Hydro GmbH and has a guaranteed life cycle of 15 years. The equipment cost USh5 billion (approx. US$1.4 million) (approx. €1.15 million), paid by Eskom Uganda.

See also

Njeru
List of hydropower stations in Africa
List of power stations in Uganda

References

External links
Uganda's Energy Outlook
Leading Uganda’s power generat ion efforts

Energy infrastructure completed in 2003
Hydroelectric power stations in Uganda
Busoga
2003 establishments in Uganda
Jinja District
Jinja, Uganda